The Banani graveyard is a cemetery in the Banani neighbourhood of Dhaka. It is one of eight state-run graveyards in Dhaka and with a capacity of around 22,000 graves it is one of the largest graveyards in that city. It covers an area of  approximately 10 acres of land and two to three burials take place every day. Banani graveyard is the burial place of a number of notable Bangladeshis, amongst them the victims of the coup d'ètat of August 15, 1975. The graveyard was established in 1973.

Notable interments

A 

 Fazle Hasan Abed
 Oli Ahad
 Gazi Shahabuddin Ahmed
 Iajuddin Ahmed
 Tazin Ahmed
 Farid Ali (actor)
 M Innas Ali
 Zubaida Gulshan Ara
 Abdus Samad Azad

B 

 Nazmul Huda Bachchu
 Anjuman Ara Begum
 Anwara Begum (academic)
 Firoza Begum (singer)
 Abdur Rahman Biswas
 Murtaja Baseer

C 

 Ahmed Zaman Chowdhury
 Amin Ahmed Chowdhury
 Mainur Reza Chowdhury
 Abu Osman Chowdhury
Najma Chowdhury

D 

 Kamal Dasgupta

E 

 Khaleda Ekram

G 

 Ustad Gul Mohammad Khan

H 

 Md. Mosharraf Hossain
 A. K. Faezul Huq
 Annisul Huq
 Kazi Zaker Husain

I 

 Muhammad Ibrahim
 Mohammad Nurul Islam
 Sirajul Islam (actor)

J 

 Shafaat Jamil

K 

 Zohra Begum Kazi
 A.Z.M. Enayetullah Khan
 Abdul Monem Khan
 M. Hasan Ali Khan
 Mahbub Ali Khan
 Shah A M S Kibria
 KS Firoz

M 

 M. A. Mannan (neurologist)
 Baby Maudud
 Mohammad Moniruzzaman Miah
 Khalid Mahmood Mithu
 Mohammad Mohammadullah
 Sheikh Fazilatunnesa Mujib
 Mishuk Munier

R 

 Arafat Rahman
 Hosne Ara Rahman
 Ivy Rahman
 Latifur Rahman
 Shamsur Rahman (poet)
 Zillur Rahman
 Shahnaz Rahmatullah
 Abdur Razzak (actor)

S 

 Saifuddin Ahmed
 Abdur Rab Serniabat
 Fazal Shahabuddin
 Sheikh Russel
 Shegufta Bakht Chaudhuri
 Abdullah-Al-Muti Sharafuddin

T 

 Syeda Zohra Tajuddin

References 

Cemeteries in Bangladesh
Dhaka